Tatu Vanhanen (17 April 1929 – 22 August 2015) was a Finnish political scientist, sociologist, and writer. He was a professor of political science at the University of Tampere in Tampere, Finland. Vanhanen was a coauthor with Richard Lynn of IQ and the Wealth of Nations (2002) and IQ and Global Inequality (2006), and author of Ethnic Conflicts Explained by Ethnic Nepotism (1999) and many other works.

Work

Vanhanen developed an interest in evolutionary biology after studying E. O. Wilson's sociobiology and later in his career wrote about intelligence and inequality. He supported applying evolutionary and genetic methods to social sciences. However, most of his academic work dealt with democratization, which he had studied with international comparative methods. Vanhanen was known for his Index of Democratization.

In 2004, the Ombudsman of Minorities, Mikko Puumalainen, asked the police to start an investigation regarding Vanhanen's interview with a Helsingin Sanomat magazine Kuukausiliite, in which he stated that "Whereas the average IQ of Finns is 97, in Africa it is between 60 and 70. Differences in intelligence are the most significant factor in explaining poverty". The Finnish National Bureau of Investigations was considering launching a preliminary investigation on Vanhanen's speech but later decided against it, not finding that he had incited hatred against an ethnic group or committed any other crime.

Personal life
Tatu Vanhanen was married to Anni Tiihonen and had three sons. One of them, Matti Vanhanen, was the Prime Minister of Finland from 2003 to 2010.

Vanhanen died on 22 August 2015 after a long period of illness, aged 86.

Bibliography in English

Books

See also
Race and intelligence

References

1929 births
2015 deaths
Finnish non-fiction writers
Finnish political scientists
Finnish sociologists
Intelligence researchers
Race and intelligence controversy
Proponents of scientific racism
Academic staff of the University of Tampere